Obouo Productions also referred as Obouo Music and Obouo Media is a record label from France founded in Beaumaris, Gwynedd by Ivorian producer David Monsoh and his partner Barbara Kahan on April 14, 2011.

History 
Obouo Productions was created Obouo Productions Ltd. and originally founded on January 20, 2003, by Ivorian producer David Monsoh and his brother Eulalie Monsoh, but 8 years later David relaunched again in 2011 in UK. The company has created other branch called Obouo Media in 2013 that is based on production of cinematographic films, videos, television programs, sound recording and music editing.

Currents artist 
 Héritier Watanabe

Former artist 

 Telehi
 Dj Arafat
 Ferre Gola
 Fally Ipupa
 Koffi Olomide

External links 
 Obouo Productions on Facebook
 Obouo Productions on Instagram 
 Obouo Productions Music

References 

French record labels
Companies established in 2011
Record labels established in 2011